The 2021 New York City Council election were held on November 2, 2021. The primary elections were held on June 22, 2021. There were several special elections for seats vacated in 2020 and early 2021; these special elections were the first to use ranked-choice voting in city council elections after it was approved by a ballot question in 2019. Due to redistricting after the 2020 Census, candidates also ran for two-year terms instead of four-year terms for the first time, stemming from the New York City Charter overhaul in 1989. Four-year terms will resume in the 2025 election after another two-year election in 2023.

Incumbents not seeking re-election

Term-limited incumbents 

28 council members (26 Democrats and 2 Republicans) are prevented from seeking a third (fourth for pre-2010 council members) consecutive term due to term limits that were renewed by voters in a ballot referendum in 2010.

Retiring incumbents

Incumbents defeated in primary

Resigned before election 

During the 2017–2021 council secession, 8 incumbents have resigned before the election for various reasons.

Manhattan

District 1
The 1st district covers the very bottom of Manhattan, including the Financial District, Tribeca, and Soho. Incumbent Democrat Margaret Chin was term-limited and cannot run for a fourth consecutive term. Christopher Marte was seen as the most progressive candidate in the race, while Jenny Low was noted for the major endorsements she had received and Gigi Li had outgoing councilwoman Chin's support. Marte's campaign was bolstered by anger within the district at Chin's ties to real-estate developers, as well as by name recognition Marte had gained while attempting to primary Chin in the previous council election.

Democratic primary

Candidates
Susan Damplo, attorney
Sean Hayes, attorney and law professor
Tiffany Johnson-Winbush, former member of Manhattan Community Board 1
Susan Lee, author and non-profit executive
Gigi Li, Chief of Staff to Margaret Chin
Jenny Low, political staffer
Maud Maron, attorney
Christopher Marte, activist
Denny Salas, activist

Withdrawn
Lester Chang
Yubao Dai
Dennis Mikhalsky

Republican primary
Jacqueline Toboroff

Results

Endorsements

General election

District 2
The 2nd district covers parts of the Lower East Side in Manhattan. Incumbent Democrat Carlina Rivera was running for reelection.

Democratic primary

Candidates
Carlina Rivera, incumbent Councillor
Erin Hussein, labor unionist
Withdrawn
Juan Pagan

Endorsements

Democratic primary

General election

Endorsements

District 3
The 3rd district covers parts of the West Side of Manhattan, including Chelsea, West Midtown, and Greenwich Village. Incumbent Democrat and current Council Speaker Corey Johnson is term-limited and cannot run for a third consecutive term.

Democratic primary

Endorsements

General election

District 4
The 4th district covers parts of the Lower East Side, East Midtown, and parts of the Upper East Side in Manhattan. The incumbent is Democrat Keith Powers, who won re-election defeating Republican David Casavis.

Democratic primary
Incumbent Councilman Keith Powers won the Democratic nomination unopposed.
Withdrawn
Jordana Lusk

General election

Endorsements

District 5
The 5th district covers parts of the Upper East Side in Manhattan. Incumbent Democrat Ben Kallos is term-limited and cannot run for a third consecutive term. He is running for Manhattan Borough President.

Democratic primary

Withdrawn
Joshua Kravitz

Endorsements

General election

District 6
The 6th district covers most of the Upper West Side in Manhattan. Incumbent Democrat Helen Rosenthal is term-limited and cannot run for a third consecutive term. She filed to run for New York City Comptroller but dropped out of the race. Sara Lind and Jeffrey Omura had an alliance during the campaign, with Lind's campaign asking voters to rank Omura second and Omura's campaign asking voters to rank Lind second.  Gale Brewer, who was the Manhattan Borough President at the time and held this seat from 2002 to 2013, won the Democratic nomination.

Democratic primary

Candidates
Gale Brewer, Manhattan Borough President
Maria Danzilo, attorney
David Gold, non-profit executive
Sara Lind, attorney
Jeffrey Omura, actor and labor unionist
Zack Weiner, screenwriter and film producer
Withdrawn
Seth Rosen (endorsed Sara Lind)
David Zelman

Endorsements

Results

General election

Endorsements

District 7
The 7th district covers West Harlem and Hamilton Heights in Manhattan. Incumbent Democrat Mark Levine is term-limited and cannot run for a third consecutive term. Levine is running for Manhattan Borough President. Shaun Abreu was considered the frontrunner in the race, while five of his opponents – Maria Ordoñez, Stacy Lynch, Marti Allen-Cummings, Dan Cohen, and Corey Ortega – formed a ranked-choice coalition to oppose him.

Democratic primary

Withdrawn
Alberto Aguilar III
Jeanette Toomer

Endorsements

General election

District 9
The 9th district covers most of the central part of Harlem in Manhattan. Incumbent Democrat Bill Perkins ran for reelection. He is currently behind challenger Kristin Richardson Jordan, a member of the Democratic Socialists of America, by 104 votes in the final RCV round. Due to the close margin, the race underwent a manual recount. On August 9, 2021, Perkins conceded the race to Jordan. The recount was completed on August 18, with Jordan winning by 114 votes.

Democratic primary

Candidates
William Allen, professor and founder of the Uptown Democratic Club
Cordell Cleare, Democratic District Leader in the 70th State Assembly district
Joshua Clennon, treasurer of Manhattan Community Board 10
William Council, coach
Pierre Gooding, deacon and attorney
Kristin Richardson Jordan, poet and activist
Ruth McDaniels, former NYPD supervisor
Bernadette McNear, program director
Athena Moore, activist
Bill Perkins, incumbent Councillor
Mario Rosser, partnership manager
Sheba Simpson, educator
Keith Taylor, member of Manhattan Community Board 10
Withdrawn
Malik Wright, political operative

Endorsements

Results

General election

District 10
The 10th district covers the northernmost part of Manhattan, including Washington Heights, Inwood, and Marble Hill. Incumbent Democrat Ydanis Rodríguez is term-limited and cannot run for a fourth consecutive term.

Democratic primary

Candidates
James Behr, attorney and author
Francesca Castellanos, activist
Angela Fernandez, former director of the New York State Division of Human Rights
Johanna Garcia, Chief of Staff to Robert Jackson
Thomas Leon, candidate for New York State Senate in 2018
Josue Perez, educator
Tirso Pina, candidate for New York City Council in 2001
Carmen De La Rosa, State assemblymember
Withdrawn
Manny De Los Santos
Everett Reed

Endorsements

Results

General election

Manhattan/Bronx crossover

District 8
The 8th district covers East Harlem in Manhattan, Mott Haven and parts of High Bridge in The Bronx, and Randalls Island. Incumbent Democrat Diana Ayala is running for reelection.

Democratic primary

Candidates
Diana Ayala, incumbent Councillor
Antoinette Glover, pastor
Tamika Mapp, businesswoman and veteran
Manuel Onativia, consultant

Endorsements

Results

General election

Endorsements

Bronx

District 11
The 11th district covers the most northwestern part of The Bronx, including Riverdale, Fieldston, Spuyten Devil, Kingsbridge, parts of Bedford Park, Norwood, Woodlawn, and parts of Wakefield. This seat is currently filled by Eric Dinowitz. The incumbent was Democrat Andrew Cohen, who was elected judge of the New York Supreme Court 12th Judicial District in 2020. A non-partisan special election was held on March 23, 2021, with the winner being eligible to run for a full term.

The election used ranked choice voting, with Eric Dinowitz remaining in the lead for all six rounds

Special election
The special election was nonpartisan.

Withdrawn
Abigail Martin (withdrew from the special election but will be in the June primary)
Marcos Sierra (withdrew from the special election but will be in the June primary)

Democratic primary

Withdrawn
Jessica Haller
Nayma Silver
Dionel Then

Endorsements

District 12
The 12th district covers the most northeastern part of The Bronx, including Williamsbridge, Co-Op City, parts of Allerton, Eastchester, and parts of Wakefield. Incumbent Democrat Andy King, who was already term-limited, was expelled on October 5, 2020. A special election to determine his replacement took place on December 22, 2020, with Kevin Riley elected the winner. He is running for a full term.

Democratic primary

Candidates
Pamela Hamilton-Johnson, non-profit executive
Shanequa Martin, social worker
Kevin Riley, incumbent Councillor

Endorsements

Results

District 13
The 13th district includes the most southeastern part of The Bronx, including Baychester, parts of Allerton, Pelham Parkway, Morris Park, Pelham Bay, Middletown, Country Club, Throggs Neck, and City Island. Incumbent Democrat Mark Gjonaj was eligible to run for a second term, but has chosen to retire instead.

Democratic primary

Candidates
Irene Estrada, former member of Bronx Community Board 11
Monique Johnson, leader of the Throgs Neck Residents Association
John Perez, former United States Army Ambassador
Marilyn Soto, former educator
Marjorie Velázquez, member of Bronx Community Board 10

Endorsements

Results

General election

Endorsements

District 14
The 14th district includes a section of the West Bronx, including Kingsbridge Heights, parts of Bedford Park, parts of Fordham, University Heights, parts of Tremont, and parts of Morris Heights. Incumbent Democrat Fernando Cabrera is term-limited and cannot run for a fourth consecutive term. He has filed to run for Bronx Borough President.

Democratic primary

Endorsements

District 15
The 15th district covers parts of the North Central Bronx, including Belmont, West Farms, parts of Bedford Park, parts of Fordham, parts of Tremont, and Little Yemen. This seat is currently filled by Oswald Feliz. The incumbent was Democrat Ritchie Torres, was elected to New York's  in 2020. A special election was held on March 23, 2021, with the winner being eligible to run for a full term.

The election used ranked choice voting, with Oswald Feliz remaining in the lead for all six rounds.

Special election
The special election was nonpartisan.

Democratic primary

Republican primary

Withdrawn
Elisa Crespo 
Julian Sepulveda (endorsed Elisa Crespo)

Endorsements

District 16
The 16th district includes parts of the South Bronx, including parts of Melrose, parts of High Bridge, parts of Morris Heights, and Morrisania. Incumbent Democrat Vanessa Gibson is term-limited and cannot run for a third consecutive term. She has filed to run for Bronx Borough President.

Democratic primary

Candidates
Abdourahamane Diallo, businessman
Ahmadou Diallo, businessman
Yves Filius, Democratic District Leader in the 77th assembly district
Althea Stevens, activist
Withdrawn
Leonardo Coello
Uniqua Smith

Endorsements

Results

District 17
The 17th district includes parts of the South Bronx, including Port Morris, parts of Melrose, Hunts Point, Longwood, and parts of Soundview. Incumbent Democrat Rafael Salamanca is running for reelection.

Democratic primary

Candidates
Helen Hines, former Chief of Staff to Andy King
Rafael Salamanca, incumbent Councillor
Withdrawn
Rafael Acevedo
George Alvarez
Lattina Brown
Melody Jimenez
Glennis Sanchez Severino

Results

Endorsements

District 18
The 18th district covers parts of the Southeast Bronx, including Parkchester, Unionport, Castle Hill, Clason Point, and parts of Soundview. Incumbent Democrat Rubén Díaz Sr. was eligible to run for a second term, but has chosen to retire instead.

Democratic primary

Green primary

Endorsements

Bronx/Queens crossover

District 22
The 22nd district is currently vacant. The incumbent was Democrat Costa Constantinides, who was term-limited and could not run for a third consecutive term. He resigned to take a position as CEO of Variety Boys and Girls Club of Queens.

Democratic primary

Candidates
Leonardo Bullaro, program director
Tiffany Cabán, attorney and candidate for Queens District Attorney in 2019
John Ciafone, landlord
Catherine Gioino, journalist
Evie Hantzopoulos, non-profit executive
Nick Velkov, yoga instructor
Withdrawn
Jamie-Faye Bean, non-profit executive
Jesse Cerrotti, activist (endorsed Cabán)
Nicholas Roloson, Chief of Staff to Costa Constantinides (endorsed Cabán)
Rod Townsend, former President of the Stonewall Democratic Club of New York City (endorsed Cabán)

Endorsements

Results

Republican primary
Felicia Kalan
Endorsements

Green primary
 Edwin DeJesus

General election

Queens

District 19
In the 19th district, Democrat Paul Vallone was term-limited. Republican Vickie Paladino won a close race over Democrat Tony Avella.

Democratic primary

Republican primary

Conservative primary

Endorsements

General election

District 20
In the 20th district, Democrat Peter Koo is term-limited and cannot run for a fourth consecutive term.

Democratic primary

Withdrawn
Isak Khaimov
Sam Wong

Endorsements

District 21
In the 21st district, incumbent Francisco Moya is running for re-election.

Democratic primary

Withdrawn
Hiram Monserrate

Endorsements

District 23
In the 23rd district, incumbent Democrat Barry Grodenchik was eligible to run for a second term, but has chosen to retire instead.

Democratic primary

Republican primary

Withdrawn
Seth Breland (endorsed Linda Lee)
Janet Dennis
Christopher Fuentes-Padilla
Mandeep Sahi

Endorsements

District 24
In the 24th district. incumbent was Democrat Rory Lancman, who resigned his seat on November 2, 2020. A special election was held on February 2, 2021, with James F. Gennaro winning and being eligible to run for a full term.

Special election

Percentages may be slightly different from 100% due to rounding.

Democratic primary

Republican primary

Withdrawn
Stanley Arden
Joshua Maynard

Endorsements

District 25
In the 25th district, incumbent Democrat Danny Dromm is term-limited and cannot run for a fourth consecutive term.

Democratic primary

Candidates
Fatima Baryab, non-profit executive
Yi Chen, activist and NYPD auxiliary
Shekar Krishnan, civil rights lawyer
Liliana Melo, District Leader for the 34th State Assembly district
Manuel Perez, interpreter and life coach
Alfonso Quiroz, vice-president of the JFK Democratic Club
William Salgado, attorney and District Leader for the 39th State Assembly district
Carolyn Tran, former chief of staff to Danny Dromm
Withdrawn
Lucy Cerezo Scully

Endorsements

Results

Libertarian primary
Suraj Jaswal, director of operations

District 26
In the 26th district, incumbent Democrat Jimmy Van Bramer is term-limited and cannot run for a fourth consecutive term. He has filed to run for Queens Borough President.

Democratic primary

Candidates
Amit Bagga, former deputy director of the New York City Census
Jonathan Bailey, former chairman of the Queens Democratic Socialists of America
Lorenzo Brea, activist
Julia Forman, former prosecutor
Glennis Gomez, political staffer
Denise Keehan-Smith, former chairperson of Queens Community Board 2
Badrun Khan, financial manager; Candidate for NY-14 in 2020
Hailie Kim, adjunct professor at Hunter College
Jesse Laymon, political strategist
Sultan al Maruf, IT director
Brent O'Leary, legal consultant
Steven Raga, former Chief of Staff to Brian Barnwell
Emily Sharpe, attorney
Julie Won, member of Queens Community Board 2
Ebony Young, non-profit executive
Withdrawn
Tavo Bortoli
Giselle Burgess
Benjamin Guttmann
Bianca Ozeri
Micah Peterson
Alexander Rias

Endorsements

Results

General election

Republican Primary
Marvin Jeffcoat, veteran

District 27
In the 27th district, incumbent Democrat Daneek Miller is term-limited and cannot run for a third consecutive term.

Democratic primary

Withdrawn
Timothy Turane

Endorsements

District 28
In the 28th district, incumbent Democrat Adrienne Adams is running for re-election.

Democratic primary

Withdrawn
Martin Hightower

Endorsements

District 29
In the 29th district, incumbent Democrat Karen Koslowitz is term-limited and cannot run for a fourth consecutive term. She has already served five terms on the NYC Council, but non-consecutively.

Democratic primary

Endorsements

District 30
In the 30th district, incumbent Democrat Robert Holden is running for re-election.

Democratic primary

Endorsements

General election

District 31
The 31st district is currently filled by Selvena Brooks-Powers, who will hold it for the remainder of the current term. The previous incumbent was Democrat Donovan Richards and was term-limited, preventing him from seeking a third consecutive term. He was elected Queens Borough President in 2020 and resigned his seat to assume that office on December 2, 2020. A special election was held on February 23, 2021, with the winner serving out Richard's term, which runs until the end of 2021 and being eligible to run for a full term in 2021.

The election was New York City's first ranked choice voting election with multiple rounds, and Selvena N. Brooks-Powers remained in the lead throughout all nine rounds.

Special election

Democratic primary

Withdrawn
Monique Charlton
Franck Joseph

Endorsements

District 32
In the 32nd district, incumbent Republican Eric Ulrich is term-limited and cannot run for a fourth consecutive term.

Republican primary

Candidates
Joann Ariola, chair of the Queens Republican Party
Stephen Sirgiovanni, businessman

Results

Democratic primary

Candidates
Kaled Alamarie, city planner
Bella Matias, non-profit executive
Michael Scala, attorney
Shaeleigh Severino, paralegal
Helal Sheikh, former educator
Felicia Singh, educator
Withdrawn
Joel Gokool, consultant
Raimondo Graziano, activist

Endorsements

Results

General election

Candidates
Joann Ariola (Republican), chair of the Queens Republican Party
Felicia Singh (Democratic), educator
Kenichi Wilson (Community First), chair of Queens Community Board 9

Endorsements

Results

Queens/Brooklyn crossover

District 34
In the 34th district, incumbent Democrat Antonio Reynoso is term-limited and cannot run for a third consecutive term. He has filed to run for Brooklyn Borough President.

Democratic primary

Candidates
Lutchi Gayot, businesswoman
Jennifer Gutiérrez, Chief of Staff to Antonio Reynoso
Andy Marte, former campaign manager for Vito J. Lopez
Scott Murphy, former advertiser
Withdrawn
Terrell Finner
Danny Marin

Results

General election

Endorsements

Brooklyn

District 33
In the 33rd district, incumbent Democrat Stephen Levin is term-limited and cannot run for a fourth consecutive term.

Democratic primary

Candidates
Elizabeth Adams, legislative director for Stephen Levin
Victoria Cambranes, community organizer
Sabrina Gates, graphic designer
Toba Pototsky, activist
Lincoln Restler, co-founder of New Kings Democrats
Stu Sherman, attorney
Ben Solotaire, Community Liaison for Stephen Levin
April Somboun, marketing consultant
Withdrawn
Glomani Bravo-Lopez, deputy Chief of Staff for Stephen Levin
Jonathan Clarke
Stephen Finley

Endorsements

Results

General election

District 35
In the 35th district, incumbent Democrat Laurie Cumbo is term-limited and cannot run for a third consecutive term.

Democratic primary

Withdrawn
Alejandra Caraballo
Terrance Knox
Maayan Zik

Endorsements

District 36
In the 36th district, incumbent Democrat Robert Cornegy is term-limited and cannot run for a third consecutive term. He ran for Brooklyn Borough President, but lost in the Democratic primary.

Democratic primary

Candidates
Henry Butler, manager of Brooklyn Community Board 3
Regina Edwards, healthcare administrator
John Joyner, entrepreneur
Tahirah Moore, former staffer for Robert Cornegy
Chi Ossé, activist
Robert Waterman, pastor
Withdrawn
Maya Cantrell
Ronald Colter
Gregory Green, retired NYPD sergeant
Reginald Swiney
Shadoe Tarver
Jason Walker, activist

Endorsements

Results

District 37
The incumbent in the 37th district was Democrat Rafael Espinal who resigned before his term was up. Darma Diaz was elected without opposition and will serve the remainder of his term. She ran for a full term, but lost the Democratic primary to Sandy Nurse.

Democratic primary

Candidates
Misba Abdin, businessman
Darma Diaz, incumbent Councillor
Christopher Durosinmi, former Vice President of the Glenmore Tenants Association
Rick Echevarria, former Department of Housing Preservation official
Heriberto Mateo, candidate for City Council in 2013
Sandy Nurse, activist and carpenter

Endorsements

Results

District 38
In the 38th district, incumbent Democrat Carlos Menchaca is term-limited and cannot run for a third consecutive term. He filed to run for mayor of New York City, but withdrew.

Candidates 
Alexa Avilés, public education advocate
Rodrigo Camarena, activist
Yu Lin, adult day care operator
Jacqui Painter, activist
Victor Swinton, NYPD officer
Cesar Zuniga, member of Brooklyn Community Board 7
Withdrawn
Ronald Ferdinand
Erik Frankel, businessman
Whitney Hu
Samuel Sierra

Endorsements

Results

District 39
In the 39th district, incumbent Democrat Brad Lander is term-limited and cannot run for a fourth consecutive term. He has filed to run for New York City Comptroller.

Democratic primary

Candidates
Mamnun Haq, healthcare worker
Shahana Hanif, former Director of Community Organizing for Brad Lander
Justin Krebs, co-founder of The Tank
Bridget Rein, lobbyist
Douglas Schneider, attorney
Jessica Simmons, educator
Brandon West, Office of Management and Budget worker
Withdrawn
Jennifer DeLuca
Nicole Hunt, activist
Patrick Johnson, teacher and labor unionist

Endorsements

Results

Libertarian primary

District 40
In the 40th district, incumbent Democrat Mathieu Eugene is term-limited and cannot run for a third consecutive term.

Democratic primary

Candidates
Cecilia Cortez, vice-president of the Ditmas Park West Association
Maxi Eugene, brother of Mathieu Eugene
Kenya Handy-Hilliard, political staffer
Harriet Hines, member of the Brooklyn Democratic Committee
Victor Jordan, attorney and economist
Rita Joseph, educator
Vivia Morgan, President of the Friends of Wingate Park
Blake Morris, attorney
Josue Pierre, District leader for the 42nd Assembly District
Edwin Raymond, NYPD officer and whistleblower
John Williams, minister
Withdrawn
David Alexis
Brian Cunningham, former Chief of Staff to Laurie Cumbo

Endorsements

Results

District 41
In the 41st district, incumbent Alicka Ampry-Samuel lost renomination to her predecessor, Darlene Mealy.

Democratic primary

Candidates
Alicka Ampry-Samuel, incumbent Councillor
Darlene Mealy. former Councillor

Endorsements

Results

Green primary

District 42
In the 42nd district, incumbent Democrat Inez Barron is term-limited and cannot run for a third consecutive term.

Democratic primary

Withdrawn
Marlon Powell

Endorsements

District 43
In the 43rd district, incumbent Democrat Justin Brannan narrowly won re-election over Republican challenger Brian Fox. Fox surprised political observers with a narrow lead on election night, but Brennan overtook him after 1,600 absentee ballots were counted.

Democratic primary
Candidates
 (Incumbent) Justin Brannan won the Democratic nomination unopposed.

Republican primary
Brian Fox

General election

Endorsements

District 44
In the 44th district, incumbent Kalman Yeger won re-election unopposed.

Democratic primary
Kalman Yeger won the Democratic Primary unopposed

General election
Kalman Yeger won re-election unopposed

Endorsements

District 45
In the 45th district, incumbent Democrat Farah Louis won re-election.

Democratic primary

Endorsements

District 46
In the 46th district, incumbent Democrat Alan Maisel is term-limited and cannot run for a third consecutive term.

Democratic primary

Candidates
Gardy Brazela, member of Brooklyn Community Board 18
Donald Cranston, businessman and consultant
Zuri Jackson, educator
Mercedes Narcisse, nurse and activist
Judy Newton, former NYPD officer
Shirley Paul, attorney
Tiffany Pryor, staffer for Cyrus Vance Jr.
Dimple Willabus, businesswoman
Withdrawn
Osamede Inerhunwunwa
Stanley Scutt
Nicholas Sterlacci

Endorsements

Results

General election

District 47
In the 47th district, incumbent Democrat Mark Treyger is term-limited and cannot run for a third consecutive term.

Democratic primary

Candidates
Alec Brook-Krasny, former state assemblymember
Ari Kagan, Democratic District Leader in the 45th assembly district
Joseph Packer, assistant manager
Steven Patzer, construction worker
Withdrawn
Winton Tran

Endorsements

Results

District 48
The 48th district was vacant. The incumbent was Democrat Chaim Deutsch, who was term-limited and could not run for a third consecutive term. In April 2021 he pled guilty to tax fraud, but through his lawyer announced his intentions to finish his term. On April 27, following a plea agreement, Deutsch was deemed to have "violated his oath of office" and was removed from the council. Inna Vernikov a former Democrat and former aide to New York State Assemblymember, Dov Hikind defeated Steve Saperstein after receiving nearly 64% of the vote. Her victory made her the first Republican to represent Brooklyn in the New York City Council since Marty Golden in 2002. Due to the vacancy she was sworn in on December 1, 2021.

Democratic primary

Withdrawn
Adam Dweck
Boris Noble

Republican primary
Inna Vernikov

General election

Endorsements

Staten Island

District 49
In the 49th district, incumbent Democrat Debi Rose is term-limited and cannot run for a fourth consecutive term.

Democratic primary

Withdrawn
Philippe-Edner Apostol-Marius
Vincent Johnson
Aidan Rivera

Endorsements

Republican primary

Withdrawn
Nicholas Robbins

District 50
In the 50th district, incumbent Republican Steven Matteo is term-limited and cannot run for a third consecutive term. He filed to run for Staten Island Borough President, but lost the Republican primary to Vito Fossella.

Republican primary

Candidates
David Carr, Chief of Staff to Steven Matteo
Jordan Hafizi, former journalist
Marko Kepi, Marine reservist and activist
Sam Pirozollo, optician
Kathleen Sforza, businesswoman

Campaign
The two frontrunners for the open council seat were David Carr, chief of staff to outgoing councilman Matteo, and Marko Kepi, a Marine reservist who had previously lost in a campaign for the New York State Assembly. The race became contentious as results were tabulated, with Carr accusing Kepi of engaging in an illegal ballot harvesting operation and forging signatures on absentee ballots. In response, Kepi accused Carr of using his influence to get the New York City Board of Elections to systematically reject ballots cast by the Albanian-American community.

Endorsements

Results

Democratic primary

Candidates
Sal Albanese, former Councilman and perennial candidate

General election

District 51
In the 51st district, incumbent Republican Joe Borelli is running for re-election.

Republican primary

Candidates
Joe Borelli, incumbent Councilman

Democratic primary

Candidates
Olivia Drabczyk, teacher

General election

Endorsements

2022 Speaker election 
Corey Johnson cannot run for re-election as Speaker because of term limits. The following individuals have expressed their interest in running:

 Adrienne Adams - District 28, Queens
 Diana Ayala - District 8, The Bronx/Manhattan
 Justin Brannan - District 43, Brooklyn
 Gale Brewer - District 6, Manhattan
 Francisco Moya - District 21, Queens
 Keith Powers - District 4, Manhattan
 Carlina Rivera - District 2, Manhattan

Joe Borelli (District 51, Staten Island) is expected to lead the Republican minority.

See also 
 2021 New York City mayoral election
 2021 New York City Comptroller election
 2021 New York City Public Advocate election
 2021 New York City Borough President elections

Notes

References 

New York City Council elections
New York City Council election
New York City Council election
Council election